Paul Hawksbee is a British sports radio presenter and comedy writer. He has presented the Hawksbee and Jacobs show alongside Andy Jacobs on talkSPORT since the station's inception in 2000, he plays the role of straight man in the partnership to funny man Jacobs' often brilliant comedic observations.

He also contributed to the writing of ITV's Harry Hill's TV Burp, Al Murray's Happy Hour, and the original Spitting Image.

Hawksbee co-founded the weekly football magazine 90 Minutes with Clive Mendonca.

Personal life
Hawksbee is a Tottenham fan.

References 

1961 births
British radio personalities
Living people